William Patrick Watkins (born September 2, 1972) is a former Major League Baseball player who played outfield for the Cincinnati Reds and Colorado Rockies.

Early life
Watkins had planned on playing football at Duke after graduating from Garner Magnet High School, and had even talked to their coach, Steve Spurrier, about playing under him. However, when Spurrier left to coach at the University of Florida and the coach who replaced him was not interested, Watkins had to change his plan. He went to East Carolina University to play baseball after his high school coach recommended him to the baseball coach there. At East Carolina, Watkins was an All-American and was drafted by the Cincinnati Reds in the 1st round (32nd pick) of the 1993 Major League Baseball Draft.

Major league career
Watkins made his major league debut on September 9,  against the Chicago Cubs.

See also
1993 College Baseball All-America Team

External links

   Pat Watkins: Keeping Life in Perspective

1972 births
Living people
Cincinnati Reds players
Colorado Rockies players
Major League Baseball outfielders
Baseball players from North Carolina
East Carolina Pirates baseball players
Billings Mustangs players
Winston-Salem Spirits players
Winston-Salem Warthogs players
Chattanooga Lookouts players
Indianapolis Indians players
Carolina Mudcats players
Colorado Springs Sky Sox players
Toledo Mud Hens players
Omaha Golden Spikes players
Garner Magnet High School alumni
People from Garner, North Carolina